John Herd Thompson (1946July 12, 2019) was a Canadian historian. A leading historian of Canada, Thompson taught North American history at a variety of universities, including Simon Fraser University, McGill University, and Duke University during a 40-year teaching career. After retiring from Duke in 2012, he moved to British Columbia. He died from lung cancer in July 2019.

Thompson was born in Winnipeg, Manitoba and earned a Ph.D. from Queen’s University in 1975. He co-authored the book Canada 1922-1939: Decades of Discord along with Allen Seager, which won the Governor General's Award for English-language non-fiction.

References

1946 births
2019 deaths
20th-century Canadian historians
Writers from Winnipeg
Canadian expatriate academics in the United States
Queen's University at Kingston alumni
Academic staff of Simon Fraser University
Academic staff of McGill University
Duke University faculty